Hanshagen is a village and a former municipality in the Nordwestmecklenburg district, in Mecklenburg-Vorpommern, Germany. Since 1 January 2011, it is part of the municipality Upahl.

References

Villages in Mecklenburg-Western Pomerania